The 1950 Major League Baseball season began on April 18 and ended on October 7, 1950, with the New York Yankees of the American League winning the World Series over the Philadelphia Phillies of the National League in four games.

The only no-hitter of the season was pitched by Vern Bickford on August 9, in the Boston Braves 7–0 victory over the Brooklyn Dodgers. This season saw the first use of a bullpen car, by the Cleveland Indians.

Awards and honors
MLB Most Valuable Player Award
 AL Phil Rizzuto, New York Yankees, SS
 NL Jim Konstanty, Philadelphia Phillies, P
MLB Rookie of the Year Award
Walt Dropo, Boston Red Sox, 1B
Sam Jethroe, Boston Braves, OF
The Sporting News Player of the Year Award
Phil Rizzuto, New York Yankees
The Sporting News Manager of the Year Award
Red Rolfe, Detroit Tigers

Standings

American League

National League

Postseason

Bracket

League leaders

American League

National League

Managers

American League

National League

Home Field Attendance

See also 
 1950 All-American Girls Professional Baseball League season
 1950 Nippon Professional Baseball season

References

External links 
1950 Major League Baseball season schedule at Baseball Reference

 
Major League Baseball seasons